Jagora is a genus of freshwater snails which have an operculum, aquatic gastropod mollusks in the family Pachychilidae.

Distribution 
This genus is endemic to the Philippines.

Species 
Species within the genus Jagora include:
 Jagora asperata (Lamarck, 1822) - type species
 Jagora dactylus (I. lea & H. C. Lea, 1850)

References

External links 

Pachychilidae